Let There Be Light is a 2007 Israeli documentary film about Meni Philips, an Haredi Jewish man who leaves his traditional community. The documentary was directed by Meni Phillip and Noam Reuveni, and was screened at the 2007 Jerusalem Film Festival.

See also 
 Unorthodox (miniseries)
 One of Us (2017 film)
 Leaving the Fold

References 

Films about Orthodox and Hasidic Jews
2007 documentary films
2007 films
Anti-Orthodox Judaism sentiment